Thanayut Kaewjohor is a professional footballer from Thailand. He currently plays for Bangkok United in the Thailand Premier League.

He previously played for Bangkok University FC in the 2007 AFC Champions League group stage.

References

Living people
Thanayut Kaewjohor
1986 births
Association football defenders
Thanayut Kaewjohor
Thanayut Kaewjohor